İsmail Ertekin (born 1 January 1959) is a Turkish football manager. He is the manager and sporting director of Bursaspor.

References

1959 births
Living people
Turkish football managers
Bursaspor managers
Fatih Karagümrük S.K. managers
Sakaryaspor managers
Sarıyer S.K. managers